John Josselyn or Jastleyn (ca. 1490 – 1553/54) was an English politician.

Josselyn was the third son of Ralph Josselyn of Hyde Hall, Sawbridgeworth, Hertfordshire and Catherine Martin of Faversham, Kent. Josselyn's father died in 1504, while his son was a minor. By 1532, he had married Anne Grenville of Wotton Underwood, Buckinghamshire. His wife was one of the gentlewomen of Queen Catherine of Aragon. In 1545 and 1547, he was MP for Buckingham.

He left all his possessions to his daughter, Margaret Foxley née Josselyn.

References

1490 births
1554 deaths
English MPs 1545–1547
English MPs 1547–1552
People from Sawbridgeworth